Greg Thomas (born 2003) is an Irish hurler who plays for Galway Senior Championship club Castlegar and at inter-county level with the Galway senior hurling team. He usually lines out as a forward.

Career

Thomas first came to prominence at juvenile and underage levels with Castlegar before eventually joining the club's senior team. He first appeared on the inter-county scene as a member of the Galway minor hurling team that won consecutive All-Ireland Minor Championship titles in 2019 and 2020. Thomas immediately progressed onto the Galway under-20 hurling team and was at right wing-forward on the team beaten by Cork in the 2002 All-Ireland under-20 final. He was drafted onto the Galway senior hurling team by new manager Henry Shefflin for the 2022 Walsh Cup.

Honours

Galway
Leinster Under-20 Hurling Championship: 2021
All-Ireland Minor Hurling Championship: 2019, 2020

References

2003 births
Living people
Castlegar hurlers
Galway inter-county hurlers